Choker is a 2005 American science fiction action horror film written and directed by Nick Vallelonga and starring Paul Sloan, Colleen Porch, Hayley DuMond, Anthony John Denison, Robert R. Shafer, Katrina Law, and Jesse Corti. The film premiered on March 19, 2005, at the Other Venice Film Festival and was released under the title Disturbance on DVD by MTI Home Video in October 2006.

Plot
Hud Masters (Paul Sloan) is released from prison to hunt down a viral-like alien race. He is taken to an agency, where he is partnered with Logan (Colleen Porch) to undergo such a mission. Together they fight their way through a horde of alien infestation in the city, until they reach the leader (Hayley Dumond). Meanwhile, Masters is desperately trying to keep himself from reverting to his violent ways.

Cast

 Paul Sloan as Hud Masters
 Colleen Porch as Logan
 Hayley DuMond as Leader
 Anthony John Denison as Lt. Murcer
 Robert R. Shafer as Lt. Clark
 Katrina Law as Santo
 Jesse Corti as Mr. Carter
 Kimberly Estrada as Kat
 Ella Thomas as Godiva
 Nina Kaczorowski as Nina
 Nick Vallelonga as Frank Russo
 James Quattrochi as Detective Rourke
 Susse Budde as Stacy Russo
 Paula Miranda as Kitten
 Arthur Lupetti as John
 Timon Kyle as Willis the Pimp
 Adrienne Janic as Gorgeous Brunette

Production
The film was shot on locations in Los Angeles, California over a twelve-day period. The roles of "Leader" and "Coroner" were originally to be played by men but were instead played by actresses Haley Dumond and Katrina Law.

Critical response
JoBlo felt that director Vallelonga created a project that was a "colorful, stylishly shot, tightly paced and overall vibrant effort", and that film editor David Risotto was to be commended for his work contributing to "the free flowing feel of the film." The also praised the film score created by Harry Manfredini, referring to it as "exciting and pulse pounding." Toward the acting, they felt that Paul Sloan was "magnetic and convincing in his somewhat dual roles", that Colleen Porch gave "impeccable delivery and hit emotional levels that went beyond what was on the page", that Hayley DuMond gave the proper "intensity, focus and menace" for her role. They also offered that the director in his own role of Frank Russo, gave "a grounded and stellar show". They also observed as a critique that Robert R. Shafer performance got on one's nerves, but that might have been the intent for his character. After their overall positive review, wherein they addressed storyline and pacing, and made note that the film's fight scenes could have been better choreographed, they concluded that the film "was a glossy, steamily sexy, clipped paced, competently acted and ingeniously written mish-mash of horror, action and Sci-Fi".

Conversely, DVD Reviews wrote that Disturbance had the potential to be either a "small gem" or a "schlocky retread", and offered that while its "Arresting visuals and a better-than-average cast" helped to raise this film "above most of the trash that sits at the bottom of the bargain bin at the local video store", the film "too often becomes immersed in triteness to stand its own ground", and that despite the film's originalities, it was "pretty standard stuff" that offers too many genre clichés.  In further criticism, they felt that the film's action was substandard, the fight choreography weak, and certain scenes were "ruined by pretentious visual manipulation". They offered that Disturbance "is a good-looking movie", but that its visual prowess could not hide the fact of the film's low budget. They conceded that use of color and shadow "are utilized strikingly" and "make for good eye candy, even if they are not overly endowed with thespian qualities", and offered that Paul Sloan has "a magnetic presence onscreen" and Hayley DuMond delivers "an impressive emotional scene toward the end," and summarize that "As far as low-budget indies go, this could have been far worse." They also felt that while director Vallelonga was "aiming for the spirit of old Roger Corman films," he missed using "Corman's witty sense of dark humor", and that even with the film having successful moments, it "doesn't rise above its direct-to-video status."  They conclude "What is ultimately most disturbing about this film is how bland it turns out to be in spite of its visual splendor and appealing performers."

Film Critics United wrote that the film title Disturbance made more sense than the original title of Choker, as the original title seemed to have nothing to do with the film's plot. They addressed the uniqueness of the alien protagonists in that they "don’t seem to be all that ambitious in that they don’t have any particular designs on world domination or anything and just want the occasional body to inhabit and suck the life out of." They also note that while Nick Vallelonga is "a better actor than film director", who has been acting and making movies for well over twenty years with marginal success", as a filmmaker he "refuses to quit." They further note that Disturbance having small budget microscopic budget did not prevent the director's efforts to "bring a little extra to the table", and that while the "story is bit derivative", it is assisted by the work of actor Paul Sloan and the director's choice of supporting cast. It was concluded that this "wasn't an awful film and it even had a certain amount of charm". And though it was "a bit rough around the edges and often had trouble rising above its low budget roots", the creative efforts were obvious.

On his review website PollyStaffle.com, filmmaker Chad Clinton Freeman wrote that for a low-budget film, Disturbance "isn’t a perfect film, but it’s pretty damn good."  He offered that the film works on a number of levels, in that the film has "great audio and visuals", a sense of "film noir", and a music score that is "perfect". He noted that the film did not have a clear cut hero and did not fit into any one specific genre or subgenre but works as these were intentional choices made by director Vallelonga.  He felt that was unique about the film was that while it had many possible main characters, it worked as an ensemble.  He made special note of the director's "use of imagery and his subtle references to other films."

Release
The film screened at various film festivals in 2005 before being picked up by MTI Home Video for release in 2006, when it was released on DVD in the United States under the title Disturbance and in the United Kingdom as B.E.I.N.G..

References

External links
 

2005 films
2005 horror films
2005 science fiction films
American independent films
American science fiction horror films
Alien invasions in films
Films scored by Harry Manfredini
Films set in Los Angeles
Films shot in Los Angeles
Films directed by Nick Vallelonga
2000s English-language films
2000s American films